Gol Mey may refer to:
 Gol Mey-e Bala
 Gol Mey-e Pain